Pebble Beach Golf Links is a public golf course on the west coast of the United States, located in Pebble Beach, California.

Regarded by Travel and Leisure blog as one of the most beautiful courses in the world, it hugs the rugged coastline and has wide open views of Carmel Bay, opening to the Pacific Ocean on the south side of the Monterey Peninsula. In 2001, it became the first public course to be selected as the No. 1 Golf Course in America by Golf Digest. Greens fees are among the highest in the world, at $525 (plus $40 cart fee or $92.50 caddie fee for non-resort guests) per round in 2018.

Four of the courses in the coastal community of Pebble Beach, including Pebble Beach Golf Links, belong to the Pebble Beach Company, which also operates three hotels and a spa at the resort. The other courses are The Links at Spanish Bay, Spyglass Hill Golf Course, and Del Monte Golf Course.

The PGA Tour and PGA Tour Champions play annual events at Pebble Beach, AT&T Pebble Beach Pro-Am and the First Tee Open. It has hosted seven men's major championships: six U.S. Opens and a PGA Championship. It also hosted the 1988 Nabisco Championship, now known as the Tour Championship, the season-ending event on the PGA Tour. World-renowned, the course is included in many golf video games, such as the Links series and the PGA Tour series.

History

The course began as part of the complex of the Hotel del Monte, a resort hotel in Monterey, California, built by Charles Crocker, one of the California's Big Four railroad barons, through Southern Pacific Railroad's property division, Pacific Improvement Company. The hotel first opened on June 10, 1880. The famous 17-Mile Drive was originally designed as a local excursion route for visitors to the Del Monte to take in the historic sights of Monterey and Pacific Grove and the scenery of what would become Pebble Beach.

The course was designed by champion golfers Jack Neville and Douglas Grant and opened on February 22, 1919. Neville also designed the back nine at Pacific Grove Municipal Golf Course on the other side of the Monterey Peninsula. His objective was to place as many of the holes as possible along the rocky and beautiful Monterey coast line. This was accomplished using a "figure 8" layout.

The course was extensively revised in 1928 by H. Chandler Egan. Other architects who have worked on the course include Alistair MacKenzie and Robert Hunter (1927) and Jack Nicklaus (creation of the new fifth hole, 1998).

On February 27, 1919, Samuel Finley Brown Morse formed the Del Monte Properties Company, and acquired the extensive holdings of the Pacific Improvement Company, which included the Del Monte Forest, the Del Monte Lodge and the Hotel Del Monte. (After World War II, the Hotel del Monte building and surrounding grounds were acquired by the United States Navy to its Naval Postgraduate School and the building was renamed Herrmann Hall.) Golf Course Histories has an aerial comparison of the changes to the course, notably the 17th hole, from 1938 to 2014.

The course was bought by a consortium of Japanese investors during the upswing of foreign investments in American properties in the early 1990s. The sale, however, generated controversy when it was discovered that one of the investors had alleged ties to organized crime in Japan. It was then bought by another group of Japanese investors before being sold to the Pebble Beach Co. several years later.

Tournaments

The first Pebble Beach Championship for Women was played February 9-12, 1923, with Marion Hollins as champion over defeated Doreen Kavanaugh.  

The first professional tournament at Pebble Beach was the Monterey Peninsula Open in 1926, which had a $5,000 purse. "Lighthorse" Harry Cooper of Texas won with a 72-hole score of 293 (+5). In 1929, Pebble hosted its first major—the U.S. Amateur. A match play event, it was won by Jimmy Johnston of Minnesota, while Bobby Jones tied for medalist honors in the stroke play qualifier, but lost his first-round match to Johnny Goodman.

In 1947, Pebble Beach began its run as one of the host courses for the Bing Crosby National Pro-Am tournament, sometimes known as the "Clam Bake", and now the AT&T Pebble Beach Pro-Am. The tournament is held annually, usually in February, and is an unusual four-round tournament. The final round on Sunday is played at Pebble Beach, but the first three rounds of pro-am play are contested in round-robin format at Pebble Beach and two other courses—currently Spyglass Hill Golf Course and Monterey Peninsula Country Club, Shores Course.

Scorecard

Nabisco Championship

U.S. Opens
Pebble Beach has hosted the U.S. Open six times: 1972, 1982, 1992, 2000, 2010, and 2019 and is scheduled a seventh time in 2027.

1972
The U.S. Open was first held at Pebble Beach in 1972, won by Jack Nicklaus, who captured his 11th major title (of an eventual 18) as a professional. It was a historically important win, as Nicklaus tied Bobby Jones with 13 major titles; a lifelong amateur, Jones' major titles were in the U.S. Open, British Open, U.S. Amateur, and British Amateur. Nicklaus won the U.S. Amateur twice, in 1959 (Broadmoor, Colorado) and 1961 (Pebble Beach).

Nicklaus secured the victory in 1972 with one of the most famous golf shots of all time.  He arrived at the 17th tee facing deteriorating weather and a brisk wind on the challenging par-3 hole. Nicklaus hit a 1-iron that bounced once and struck the flagstick; it came to rest next to the cup for a tap-in birdie.

Two months earlier, Nicklaus had won the Masters to become the first in a dozen years (Arnold Palmer in 1960) to win golf's first two major titles of the season. At the British Open in July, Nicklaus shot a final round 66 to finish second, one stroke behind Lee Trevino, ending his Grand Slam run in 1972. (Palmer also missed a third straight major by a stroke at the 1960 British Open.) Through 2017, only one golfer has won the Masters, U.S. Open, and British Open in the same calendar year: Ben Hogan in 1953.

Nicklaus also won the Crosby events on either side of this Open, in 1972 and 1973, and previously in 1967.

1982
Nicklaus was also a key player in 1982 at Pebble Beach. On the front nine on Sunday, Nicklaus made five straight birdies on holes 3 through 7 and finished ahead of the last group tied for the lead. As was the case in 1972, the 17th hole was again the site of one golf's most memorable shots. In the last group, future Hall Of Famer Tom Watson hit his tee shot on the par-3 17th just a few feet off the green, into heavy rough which had been grown very tall and thick, typical of USGA Open playing conditions. His succeeding pitch was from above the hole; he needed to strike the ball firmly to get the ball out of the rough, but such an aggressive attack would likely leave a long comeback putt to save par, unless hit perfectly.  In a live television interview immediately after Watson's errant tee shot, and given the difficulty of Watson's upcoming pitch shot Nicklaus appeared confident that he would soon be in the outright lead.

Watson was apparently equally confident. He and his caddy Bruce Edwards strategized on the shot, and Edwards encouraged him to get the ball close. Watson replied, "Close, hell, I'm going to sink it." The pitch came out perfectly, landed softly and rolled into the cup. Watson ran onto the green jubilantly and gestured back at Edwards saying "I told you so". He then birdied the challenging par-5 18th hole for a two-shot victory margin in his only U.S. Open win. Watson had previously won twice at Pebble Beach, in the Crosby events of 1977 and 1978.

During the following winter, a storm eroded portions of the 17th green and 18th tee box into the Pacific Ocean. Though rebuilt, the exact spot where Watson struck his historic chip shot no longer exists.

1992
The 1992 championship was one of the most difficult ever played at Pebble Beach, with clear skies and brisk winds on the weekend. Only two players finished under par: champion Tom Kite at 285 (-3) and runner-up Jeff Sluman at 287 (-1). Gil Morgan was 12 under par early in the third round, but later fell back. Kite was one of the best players on tour in the 1980s, with 19 top tens in majors prior to 1992. Perhaps the best player of his era without a major, he finally won at Pebble Beach at age 42.

This championship was also notable as the last par-72 course in the U.S. Open, with no converted par 5's, until 2017, when Erin Hills, which was built in 1998, played as a par-72. It also marked Phil Mickelson's first major as a professional.

2000
Perhaps looking for a special place to host in 2000, the USGA decided that Pebble Beach should host the first U.S. Open of the millennium and the 100th edition of the tournament. In some respects, this Open was even tougher than the 1992 contest, with only one player finishing under par – champion Tiger Woods. Woods scored 65-69-71-67 to tie a U.S. Open record with 272, and set a U.S. Open record by finishing 12 under par, reaching Morgan's mark during his final round but recording no bogeys during the final round to finish 15 shots ahead of joint runners-up Miguel Ángel Jiménez and Ernie Els – the largest margin of victory ever in a major championship, surpassing the 13-shot record margin set by Old Tom Morris at the 1862 Open Championship at Prestwick.

Woods' first U.S. Open championship and third career major was also the start of his non-calendar year "Tiger Slam" as he also won the following three majors to hold all four major titles simultaneously (in order, the 2000 Open Championship at the Old Course at St Andrews, the 2000 PGA Championship at Valhalla and the 2001 Masters at Augusta National). It also made Woods the first to win the U.S. Junior Amateur, U.S. Amateur and U.S. Open. This was also Jack Nicklaus' 44th consecutive and final U.S. Open, as well as the last for two-time champion Curtis Strange.

On the eve of the tournament, the 18th hole also hosted a memorial for Payne Stewart, who had won the previous year's tournament at Pinehurst No. 2 but then died in a plane crash in October at the age of 42. Speakers included Stewart's widow Tracey and Payne's friend and fellow professional Paul Azinger, while attendees included Stewart's caddy Mike Hicks and other professionals who then competed in the tournament such as Mickelson, David Duval, Davis Love III, Tom Lehman, Lee Janzen and Sergio García. The ceremony concluded with shots being hit into Stillwater Cove in a golf version of a 21-gun salute. García also wore Stewart's trademark navy plus fours during his opening round, while Nicklaus was given Stewart's defending champion spot in the traditional pairings alongside Open Championship winner Paul Lawrie and U.S. Amateur winner David Gossett and asked for a moment of silence in Stewart's memory before his opening tee shot.

2010
Graeme McDowell won in 2010 by one stroke over Grégory Havret. Ernie Els finished third, with Woods and Phil Mickelson in a tie for fourth. McDowell, from Northern Ireland, became the first European to win the U.S. Open in forty years. In his last U.S. Open, 1982 champion Watson at age 60 became the second-oldest player to make a U.S. Open cut (after Sam Snead, age 61 in 1973), and finished tied for 29th.

2019
Gary Woodland won in 2019 by three strokes over Brooks Koepka. Woodland prevented Koepka from becoming the first golfer in over 100 years to win three consecutive U.S. Opens. In his final amateur tournament, Viktor Hovland finished tied for 12th. With a 4-under total of 280, Hovland broke Jack Nicklaus' U.S. Open scoring total for an amateur. Nicklaus shot 282 over four rounds at Cherry Hills Country Club in 1960.

Major tournaments hosted

^ Sudden-death playoff, won on third extra hole
 Par 72 for majors through 1992; par 71 for majors since (2nd hole changed to par 4 in 2000)

Controversy over further golf course development
There has been continuing controversy between recreational interests and environmental protection, related to a proposed new golf course development by the Pebble Beach Company. The new golf course proposal has existed in some form since the early 1990s; while the environmental protection issues center on the potential damage to rare and endangered species in this locale. The Pebble Beach Company agreed to leave 635 acres of forest area on the Pebble Beach property undeveloped.

References

External links

 
 Golf Course Histories aerial comparison 1938 v 2014
Golf Nation: overhead views of each hole
 AT&T Pebble Beach National Pro-Am: official site
 Coverage on the PGA Tour's official site

Golf clubs and courses in California
Sports venues in Monterey County, California
1919 establishments in California
Pebble Beach, California
Sports venues completed in 1919